The 1954 NCAA basketball tournament involved 24 schools playing in single-elimination play to determine the national champion of men's NCAA Division I college basketball. It began on March 8 and ended with the championship game on March 20 in Kansas City, Missouri. A total of 28 games were played, including a third-place game in each region and a national third-place game.

La Salle, coached by Ken Loeffler, won the national title with a  victory in the final game over Bradley, coached by Forddy Anderson. Tom Gola of La Salle was named the tournament's Most Outstanding Player.

Of note, Kentucky, the top-ranked team in the nation (with a record of 25–0) did not participate in any post-season tournament. Since several key players had technically graduated the year before (when Kentucky was banned from playing a competitive schedule due to the point-shaving scandal a few years earlier), those players were ruled ineligible for the NCAA tournament. Despite the wishes of the players, Adolph Rupp ultimately decided his team would not play.

LSU represented the Southeastern Conference in the tournament, its last appearance until 1979, well after the graduation of NCAA all-time leading scorer Pete Maravich. LSU made only one postseason appearance over the next 24 seasons, the 1970 National Invitation Tournament, during Maravich's senior season.

Locations
The following are the sites selected to host each round of the 1954 tournament:

East-1 Region

First round (March 8)
Buffalo Memorial Auditorium, Buffalo, New York
Duke Indoor Stadium, Durham, North Carolina

East-1 Regional (March 12 and 13)
The Palestra, Philadelphia, Pennsylvania

East-2 Region

First round (March 9)
Allen County War Memorial Coliseum, Fort Wayne, Indiana

East-2 Regional (March 12 and 13)
Iowa Field House, Iowa City, Iowa

West-1 Region

First round (March 8)
Robertson Memorial Field House, Peoria, Illinois

West-1 Regional (March 12 and 13)
Gallagher Hall, Stillwater, Oklahoma

West-2 Region

First round (March 9) and West-2 Regional (March 12 and 13)
Oregon State Coliseum, Corvallis, Oregon

Final Four

March 19 and 20
Municipal Auditorium, Kansas City, Missouri

For the second straight year, and the fifth overall, Kansas City and the Municipal Auditorium hosted the Final Four. The tournament included five new venues. The city of Buffalo hosted games for the only time at the Aud; the tournament would not return to Western New York until 2000 when its replacement, HSBC Arena, would host. Also serving for the only time was Duke Indoor Stadium, the venerable home of the Duke Blue Devils in Durham, the second of the Tobacco Road schools to host games.  For the first time, the tournament came to the state of Iowa, playing at the University of Iowa's Field House. The tournament also came to the city of Peoria for the only time to date, playing at Robertson Memorial Field House on the campus of Bradley University. And for the first time, the tournament came to the state of Oklahoma, playing at Gallagher Hall, home to the powerhouse teams of Hank Iba and Oklahoma A&M College.

Teams

Bracket
* – Denotes overtime period

East-1 Region

East-2 Region

West-1 Region

West-2 Region

Final Four

See also
 1954 National Invitation Tournament
 1954 NAIA Basketball Tournament

References

NCAA Division I men's basketball tournament
Ncaa
NCAA  Basketball Tournament
NCAA basketball tournament